See Yohanan for more rabbis by this name.

Yohanan ben Zakkai  (Yōḥānān ben Zakkaʾy; 1st century CE), sometimes abbreviated as Ribaz for Rabbi Yohanan ben Zakkai, was one of the Tannaim, an important Jewish sage during the late Second Temple period and in the transformative post-destruction era. He was a primary contributor to the core text of Rabbinic Judaism, the Mishnah. His name is often preceded by the honorific title, "Rabban." He is widely regarded as one of the most important Jewish figures of his time and his escape from the Roman destruction of Jerusalem, that allowed him to continue teaching, may have been instrumental in rabbinic Judaism surviving the destruction. His tomb is located in Tiberias, within the Maimonides burial compound.

Yohanan was the first Jewish sage attributed the title of rabbi in the Mishnah.

Life 

The Talmud reports that, in the mid-first century, he was particularly active in opposing the Sadducees' interpretations of Jewish law, and produced counter-arguments to the Sadducees' objection to the Pharisees. So dedicated was he to opposing the Sadducee view of Jewish law, that he prevented the Jewish high priest, who was a Sadducee, from following the Sadducee interpretation of the Red Heifer ritual.
 
His home, at this time, was in Arav, a village in the Galilee, where he spent eighteen years. However, although living among them, he found the attitude of Galileans to be objectionable, allegedly exclaiming that they hated the Torah and would therefore "fall into the hands of robbers." During the outbreak of hostilities, he settled in Jerusalem.
 
During the siege of Jerusalem in the First Jewish–Roman War, he argued in favour of peace; according to the Talmud, when he found the anger of the besieged populace to be intolerable, he arranged a secret escape from the city inside a coffin, so that he could negotiate with Vespasian (who, at this time, was still just a military commander). Yochanan correctly predicted that Vespasian would become Emperor, and that the temple would soon be destroyed; in return, Vespasian granted Yochanan three wishes: the salvation of Yavne and its sages, the descendants of Rabban Gamliel, who was of the Davidic dynasty, and a physician to treat Rabbi Tzadok, who had fasted for 40 years to stave off the destruction of Jerusalem.

Upon the destruction of Jerusalem, Yochanan converted his school at Yavne into the Jewish religious centre, insisting that certain privileges, given by Jewish law uniquely to Jerusalem, should be transferred to Yavne. His school functioned as a re-establishment of the Sanhedrin, so that Judaism could decide how to deal with the loss of the sacrificial altars of the temple in Jerusalem, and other pertinent questions. Referring to a passage in the Book of Hosea, "I desired mercy, and not sacrifice", he helped persuade the council to replace animal sacrifice with prayer, a practice that continues in today's worship services; eventually Rabbinic Judaism emerged from the council's conclusions.

In his last years he taught at Bror Hayil, a location near Yavne. His habitude was to wear his Tefillin (phylacteries) all throughout the day, both in summer and winter. However, during the hot summer months, he only wore his arm phylactery. His students were present at his deathbed, and were requested by him, in his penultimate words, according to the Talmudic record, to reduce the risk of ritual contamination conveyed by a corpse:

More enigmatic were the Talmud's record of his last words, which seem to relate to Jewish messianism:

According to the Talmud, Yochanan ben Zakkai lived 120 years.
His students returned to Yavneh upon his death, and he was buried in the city of Tiberias; eleven centuries later, Maimonides was buried nearby. In his role as leader of the Jewish Council, he was succeeded by Gamliel II.

Yochanan's encounter with Vespasian

The following story is related in the Jewish classic, Avoth deRabbi Nathan (version B, chapter 4:5), concerning the war with Rome.

Enactments 
Jewish tradition records Yohanan ben Zakkai as being extremely dedicated to religious study, claiming that no one ever found him engaged in anything but study. He is considered to be someone who passed on the teachings of his predecessors; on the other hand, numerous homiletic and exegetical sayings are attributed to him and he is known for establishing a number of edicts in the post-destruction era:
 After the destruction of Jerusalem, the shofar shall be blown in beit din when Rosh HaShana falls on Shabbat (prior to the destruction, it was only blown in Jerusalem and its environs on Shabbat)
 After the destruction of Jerusalem, the Four Species shall be taken in the hand for the entire Sukkot (prior to the destruction, it was only taken for the entire holiday in Jerusalem and on the first of the holiday elsewhere)
 After the destruction of Jerusalem, eating of chadash (new grain) shall be prohibited for the entire Day of Waving or yom haneif (the day that the omer sacrifice was offered, the sixteenth of Nisan; prior to the destruction, it was prohibited only up until the time of the waving on that day)
 After the destruction of Jerusalem, witnesses for the new moon shall be accepted all day (prior to the destruction, witnesses were only accepted until the afternoon tamid offering)
 After the destruction of Jerusalem, witnesses for the new moon shall only go to the place of assembly, and not follow the Nasi or "prince" (prior to the destruction, witnesses were only accepted at the location of the Nasi in Jerusalem)
 Kohanim (those of the priestly caste) may not go up to bless the people while wearing footwear
 After the destruction of Jerusalem, witnesses for the new moon may not violate the Shabbat except for the months of Nisan and Tishrei (prior to the destruction, witnesses were allowed to violate the Sabbath for all months)
 After the destruction of Jerusalem, converts no longer separate monies for their conversion sacrifice (prior to the destruction, part of the conversion process was to bring a sacrifice in the Temple in Jerusalem)
 The identity of the ninth edict is disputed:
 After the destruction of Jerusalem, the Second Tithe was permitted to be exchanged for money within a day's journey of Jerusalem (prior to the destruction, exchanges were only permitted for those living farther than a day's journey)
 After the destruction of Jerusalem, the red string associated with the chatas of Yom Kippur was sent with the ish iti (designee) to Azazel (prior to the destruction, the red string was maintained on the premises of the Temple)

Quotes 
If you are holding a sapling in your hand and someone tells you, 'Come quickly, the Messiah is here!', first finish planting the tree and then go to greet the Messiah.
If you have been studious in learning the Torah, do not take credit to yourself, since it is to this end that you were created.Pirkei Abot 2:8

Some of Rabbi Yohanan's comments were of an esoteric nature. On one occasion he advises that mankind should seek to understand the infinity of God, by imagining the heavens being extended to unthinkable distances. He argued that Job's piety was not based on the love of God, but on the fear of Him.

He was challenged to resolve several biblical curiosities by a Roman commander, who was familiar with the Torah, but whose name has been lost in confusion. Among the issues were the fact that the numbers in the Book of Numbers didn't add up to their totals, and the reasoning behind the ritual of the red heifer; on this latter question the answer he gave didn't satisfy his own students, so he decreed that the ritual was one that shouldn't be questioned.

Burial place
He is buried in HaRambam compound / complex in Tiberias / Tveria.

Other notable rabbis also buried in HaRambam compound / complex:
 Shelah HaKadosh
 Maimonides
 Eliezer ben Hurcanus
 Joshua ben Hananiah

See also

Yochanan ben Zakai Synagogue, located in Jerusalem's Old City.
Ben Zakai, a village in central Israel.

Notes

References

External links 

 Video Lecture on Yohanan ben Zakkai by Dr. Henry Abramson
JOHANAN B. ZACCAI Jewish Encyclopedia
Rabbi Yochanan ben Zaccai Israel Guide
"Rabbi Yochanan ben Zaccai" Orthodox Union
“Was Yohanan ben Zakkai a Priest?” by Daniel R. Schwartz (translated from Hebrew at WholeStones.org)

Mishnah rabbis
1st-century rabbis
Pirkei Avot rabbis
Sanhedrin